Páll Mohr Joensen is a Faroese footballer who plays for HB Tórshavn. In 2005, he joined NSÍ Runavík on loan until the end of the season. In the following season HB were expelled from the Faroe Islands Cup because Joensen was not eligible to play for HB in the first round match, due to HB not having the correct player certificate for Joensen after his loan at NSÍ. But HB were later reinstated.
He missed much of the 2010 season while away travelling around Europe.

Joensen made his debut for Faroe Islands national team in March 2009 in a 2–1 win against Iceland.

References
Páll Mohr Joensen player profile on hb.fo

Faroese footballers
Faroe Islands international footballers
Havnar Bóltfelag players
1986 births
Living people
Association football forwards